Wisteriopsis is a genus of flowering plants belonging to the family Fabaceae. Its native range is China to Indo-China and Temperate Eastern Asia. Wisteriopsis species are twining woody vines, generally resembling species of Wisteria. The genus was established in 2019 as a result of a molecular phylogenetic study, and includes species formerly placed in Millettia or Callerya.

Description
They climb over shrubs or sprawl over rocks. The leaves are either deciduous or more often evergreen, with about 7–15 leaflets arranged in opposite pairs plus a terminal leaflet. The flowers are arranged in panicles, or sometimes racemes in the leaf axils. The five lobed calyx has a ring of fine hairs at the mouth so that the margin of each sepal is ciliate. Each flower has the typical shape of members of the family Fabaceae. The standard or banner petal is white, sometimes with a greenish, pink or purple flush, and has a yellow or green nectar guide inside. When the flowers open, the wing petals are free from the keel and the staminal column is visible between the wings and the keel. Nine of the stamens are fused together at the base, the other is free.

Taxonomy

The genus Wisteriopsis was established in 2019 as a result of a molecular phylogenetic study of genera related to Callerya. Some species previously placed in Millettia or Callerya were found not to belong with the type species of those genera, but to form a separate clade, which became the basis of Wisteriopsis. The name is derived from Wisteria and -opsis, meaning 'like Wisteria'. The type species is Wisteriopsis japonica (basionym Wisteria japonica). Wisteriopsis was placed in the expanded tribe Wisterieae.

Wisteriopsis is most closely related to the genus Nanhaia. Both genera are distinguished by a ring of hairs surrounding the rim of the calyx. Wisteriopsis has glabrous (hairless) ovaries, whereas Nanhaia has densely hairy ovaries.

Species
, Plants of the World Online accepted five species:
 Wisteriopsis championii (Benth.) J.Compton & Schrire 
 Wisteriopsis eurybotrya (Drake) J.Compton & Schrire 
 Wisteriopsis japonica (Siebold & Zucc.) J.Compton & Schrire
 Wisteriopsis kiangsiensis (Z.Wei) J.Compton & Schrire
 Wisteriopsis reticulata (Benth.) J.Compton & Schrire

Distribution
Wisteriopsis species are native to eastern temperate and tropical Asia: central and southeastern China, Hainan, Japan, Korea, Laos, the Ryukyu Islands, Taiwan, Thailand and Vietnam. One species, Wisteriopsis reticulata, has been introduced into Florida.

References

Wisterieae
Fabaceae genera